Hidden Invasion is a video game designed by Toka. The European version was published by Swing! Entertainment Media AG in 2001 and the American version by Conspiracy Games in 2002, both for the PlayStation 2. GameCube and Xbox versions were also announced but were later canceled.

Overview
Players are given the option of playing as either one of two playable characters, Dean Travis or Karen Bride. The two playable characters possess different stats and abilities allowing for multiple strategies. Players venture through multiple levels in seven stages. The camera is set allowing the player to see only an area of a level. Once the player leaves an area, the camera switches to the camera in the new area.

In the year 2027, one or two members of the Shadowforce Team is sent to assassinate the leader of a "terrorist" organization who has taken a hospital hostage in Alpha City. After defeating the terrorist boss, the agent is attacked by an unknown creature. When the Shadowforce agent recovers, a surviving "terrorist" explains a conspiracy in which aliens are attempting to take over Earth. The agent must then defeat the invading aliens.

Reception

The game received "unfavorable" reviews according to the review aggregation website Metacritic.

References

Hidden Invasion. (design features of soon-to-be-released action game) (Brief Article) (Product Announcement), Official U.S. PlayStation Magazine, Sep. 2001.

External links
 

2001 video games
Action video games
PlayStation 2 games
PlayStation 2-only games
Video games developed in France
Cancelled GameCube games
Cancelled Xbox games
Multiplayer and single-player video games
Conspiracy Entertainment games
Toka (company) games
Swing! Entertainment games